Men in Black II (stylized as MIIB) is a 2002 American science fiction action comedy film based on the Marvel Comics series of a similar name. It is the sequel to Men in Black (1997) and is the second installment in the Men in Black franchise. The film was directed by Barry Sonnenfeld from a screenplay by Robert Gordon and Barry Fanaro, and it stars Tommy Lee Jones, Will Smith, Lara Flynn Boyle, Johnny Knoxville, Rosario Dawson, Tony Shalhoub, and Rip Torn. In the film, the emergence of an assumed subdued alient threat reunites Kevin Brown / Agent K (Jones) and James Darrell Edwards III / Agent J (Smith).

Development for a sequel film began following the box office success of the original; Jones, Smith, and Sonnenfeld's returns were confirmed by 2001, and David Koepp was initially hired to write the screenplay. Koepp then left production to work on Spider-Man (2002) and was replaced with Gordon and Fanaro. Principal photography began on June 11, 2001 and lasted until that September, taking place primarily in New York City; filming was delayed and several scenes were reworked following the September 11 attacks. The film's soundtrack contained the theme song "Black Suits Comin' (Nod Ya Head)", performed by Smith. 

Men in Black II premiered at Mann Village Theater in Westwood, Los Angeles on June 26, 2002, and was theatrically released in the United States by Sony Pictures Releasing on July 3. It received mixed reviews from critics, who found it to be inferior compared to its predecessor but praised the performances of Jones and Smith. The film grossed $441.8 million worldwide, becoming the fifth-highest grossing film of 2002. The sequel, Men in Black 3, was released in 2012.

Plot
In July 2002, Agent J has become a top agent but has developed a habit of neuralyzing partners he feels are emotionally unfit to cope with the work. When he is called to investigate the murder of an alien, Ben, at his pizzeria, waitress Laura Vasquez tells him that the murderers are Serleena, a shapeshifting, worm-like Kylothian who has taken the form of a Victoria's Secret lingerie model, and her two-headed servant Scrad and Charlie. Laura says they were looking for something called the Light of Zartha. J is strongly attracted to Laura, and in violation of MiB rules, does not neuralyze her to erase her memories.

J finds that little is known about the Light of Zartha, except that it is immensely powerful. As he investigates the crime, every lead points to his former partner and mentor, Agent K, who was neuralyzed upon retirement five years previously and remembers nothing of his MIB service. In Truro, Massachusetts, where K is now the town's postmaster, J convinces him of his past by proving that all of his fellow postal workers are aliens.

Back in New York City, Serleena, along with Scrad and Charlie, launches an attack on MIB headquarters before K's neuralyzation can be reversed, but Jack Jeebs has an illegal deneuralyzer in his basement. K eventually regains his memories but remembers that years before, he neuralyzed himself specifically to erase what he knew of the Light of Zartha and those memories have not returned. As a precaution, he left himself a series of clues.

At the pizzeria, they find a locker key. J and K fear for Laura's safety and hide her with the worms. The key opens a locker in Grand Central Terminal where a society of tiny aliens, who worship K as their deity, guard their most sacred relics: K's wristwatch and video store membership card.

At the store, as J and K watch a fictionalized story of the Light of Zartha, K remembers the Zarthan Queen Lauranna long ago entrusted Men in Black with safeguarding the Light from her nemesis, Serleena, who followed Lauranna to Earth and killed her. After hiding the Light, a grief-stricken K neuralyzed himself, both to bury his sadness and to ensure that he would never reveal its hiding place. K still cannot remember where he hid it nor what the Light looks like. Thinking it might be Laura's bracelet, he only remembers that it must return to Zartha soon or both Earth and Zartha will be destroyed.

At the worms' apartment, they find that Laura has been captured by Serleena. With the worms, they counterattack MIB headquarters, freeing Laura and the other agents. Serleena attempts to retaliate by chasing them with a spaceship through New York but is eaten by Jeff, a gigantic worm alien living in the New York City Subway.

Laura's bracelet leads J and K to the roof of a skyscraper where a ship stands ready to transport the Light back to Zartha. K reveals that Laura is the daughter of Lauranna (and, it is implied, his daughter) and that she's also the Light. K convinces J and Laura that she must go to Zartha to save both her planet and Earth from destruction. Serleena, who has absorbed Jeff and taken his form, attempts to snatch the ship carrying Laura as it lifts off, but J and K blast her out of the sky. Since all of New York City has just witnessed this battle in the skies over the metropolis, K activates a giant neuralyzer in the torch of the Statue of Liberty.

Back at MIB headquarters, J finds the tiny locker-dwelling aliens now in his locker, moved there by K and Chief Zed in an attempt to give him some perspective. When J suggests showing the miniature creatures that their universe is bigger than a locker, K kicks open a door and reveals that the human universe is itself a locker within an immense alien train station.

Cast
 Will Smith as James Darrel Edwards III / Agent J: Still on active duty with the MIB, he is not satisfied with the partners assigned to him and keeps neuralizing them.
 Tommy Lee Jones as Kevin Brown / Agent K: A decommissioned senior MIB agent and the only person who used to know how to stop the latest threat to Earth's safety.
 Rip Torn as Chief Zed: The head of the MIB.
 Lara Flynn Boyle as Serleena: A shapeshifting Kylothian alien who comes to Earth to find a vital power source used by her race's enemies.
 Johnny Knoxville as Scrad / Charlie: A humanoid alien (Scrad), with a second small head (Charlie) on a stalk protruding from his neck, who does Serleena's dirty work.
 Rosario Dawson as Laura Vasquez: A young woman who turns out to be the long-lost alien princess from Zartha and the power source sought by Serleena.
 Tony Shalhoub as Jack Jeebs: An alien pawn shop owner who uses a home-built machine to "de-neuralize" K and restore his memory.
 Patrick Warburton as Agent T: Partnered with J, who neuralizes him and throws him out of the MIB after an incident with Jeff.
 Jack Kehler as Ben
 David Cross as Newton
 Colombe Jacobsen as Hailey
 John Alexander as Jarra
 Michael Jackson as Agent M (cameo)
 Martha Stewart as Herself (cameo)
 Peter Graves as Himself
 Linda Kim as Princess Lauranna, an alien from Zartha and the mother of Laura.
 Paige Brooks as 'Mysteries in History' Lauranna
 Nick Cannon as MIB Autopsy Agent
 Biz Markie as Alien Beatboxer
 Jeremy Howard as Postal Sorting Alien
 Martin Klebba as Family Child Alien
 Doug Jones as Joey

Voices
 Tim Blaney as Frank the Pug
 Brad Abrell as Worm Guy
 Greg Ballora as Worm Guy
 Thom Fountain as Worm Guy
 Carl J. Johnson as Worm Guy
 Richard Pearson as Gordy

Production
Despite some initial involvement from David Koepp (who left to work on Panic Room and Spider-Man), the script was written by Robert Gordon and later revised by Barry Fanaro, who added pop culture references, something which Gordon had deliberately avoided. Sonnenfeld took issue with the producers' focus on the love story between Will Smith's and Rosario Dawson's characters, saying that "I learned on Wild Wild West that audiences didn't want to see Will as the straight man. And until Tommy comes back into the movie, by definition Will's the straight man." Fanaro condensed the first part of the film and brought Agent K in earlier. Famke Janssen was originally cast as Serlenna, but dropped out due to personal issues, Lara Flynn Boyle was hired to replace her.

Principal photography began on June 11, 2001 and ended on September 23, 2001. The climax of the story was originally filmed against a backdrop of the twin towers of the original World Trade Center; but after the September 11 attacks, the climactic scene was reworked. Other scenes incorporating views of the twin towers likewise were edited, or reshot. Filming for Men in Black II was also suspended due to the attacks.

Supervising sound editor Skip Lievsay used a Synclavier to recreate and improve the original recording of the neuralyzer sound effect from the first film (which was the sound of a strobe flash as it recycles) by removing some distortion. For some of the scenes with the Serleena creature, the sound crew "took tree branches, put them inside a rubber membrane and pushed that around and added some water." For the special effects scene where the subway train is attacked by Jeff the Worm, a specially designed vise was used to crush a subway car and make it look as if it had been bitten in half.

Music
The motion picture soundtrack to Men In Black II was released on June 25, 2002 by Columbia Records.

Release

Marketing
In October 2001, the first photos for Men in Black II were revealed. A teaser trailer premiered in December 2001, which was attached to the screenings of The Lord of the Rings: The Fellowship of the Ring and Ali. Just four months later in April 2002, a new trailer was released online. It made its theatrical debut on May 3 with the opening of Spider-Man.

Burger King began selling a variety of kids meal toys themed to the film at their restaurants. Several action figures were also released by Hasbro at the North American International Toy Fair event.

A video game partly based on the film was released in 2002, titled Men in Black II: Alien Escape.

Home media
Men In Black II was released on DVD and VHS on November 26, 2002, and on Blu-ray on May 1, 2012. It came with an alternate ending where J is sent to the homeworld of the aliens from Grand Central Station.

In the United Kingdom, the film was watched by 710,000 viewers on subscription television channel Sky Movies 1 in 2004, making it the year's eighth most-watched film on subscription television.

The entire Men In Black series was released on 4K UHD Blu-Ray on December 5, 2017.

Reception

Box office
Released theatrically on July 3, 2002, Men in Black II earned $18.5 million on its opening day, making it the third-highest Wednesday opening, behind Star Wars: Episode I – The Phantom Menace and Jurassic Park III. The film would go on to make $52,148,751 during its opening weekend, becoming the highest Fourth of July three-day opening weekend, surpassing its predecessor Men in Black. Within five days, it grossed $87.1 million, breaking Independence Days record for having the biggest five-day Fourth of July Wednesday opening. Men in Black II would hold the record for having the largest Fourth of July opening weekend until it was surpassed by Spider-Man 2 in 2004. That same year, I, Robot tied the record for having the highest opening weekend for a Will Smith film. Both films remained so until 2007 when they were taken by I Am Legend. The film was ranked number one at the box office upon opening, beating out The Powerpuff Girls Movie. It would go on to compete against other summer films like Lilo & Stitch, Mr. Deeds and Minority Report. The film held the number one position in its second weekend with revenue of $24,410,311, a 53.2% decrease from the previous weekend. The third weekend saw a 40.4% decrease, with box office of $14,552,335, coming in at number three.

In its fourth weekend, the film was at fourth place, with revenue of $8,477,202. Men in Black II fell out of the top ten after five weekends. After sixty-two days of release in North America, Men in Black II had grossed $190,418,803. 43.1% of the film's worldwide revenue of $441,818,803 came from North America.

Critical response
On review aggregator Rotten Tomatoes, the film holds an approval rating of 38% based on 198 reviews, with an average score of 5.30/10. The website's critical consensus reads, "Lacking the freshness of the first movie, MIB 2 recycles elements from its predecessor with mixed results." On Metacritic, the film received a score of 49 based on 37 reviews, indicating "mixed or average reviews". Audiences polled by CinemaScore gave the film an average grade of "B+" on an A+ to F scale.

A. O. Scott of The New York Times said, "Within the trivial, ingratiating scope of its ambition... the sequel is pleasant enough" and, noting the vast array of aliens designed by Rick Baker, said that the film "really belongs to Mr. Baker." A review in The Hindu called the film "worth viewing once." A review from Digital Media FX magazine praised the spaceships as looking realistic, but criticized many of the simpler visual effects, such as the moving backgrounds composited behind the car windows using blue-screen (which it called a throwback to the special effects of earlier decades). In August 2002, Entertainment Weekly placed the Worm Guys among their list of the best CG characters, and said that enlarging the roles of Frank the Pug and the Worm Guys in Men in Black II was beneficial for the "tiring franchise."

The film was nominated for a Visual Effects Society Award for "Best Visual Effects in a Visual Effects Driven Motion Picture" but lost to The Lord of the Rings: The Two Towers. The film also earned a Razzie Award nomination for Lara Flynn Boyle as Worst Supporting Actress.

Sequels

A sequel titled Men in Black 3, was released in 2012.

A fourth installment, Men in Black: International, was released in 2019.

References

External links

 
 
  
 

2002 films
2002 science fiction action films
2000s science fiction comedy films
2000s monster movies
Amblin Entertainment films
American action comedy films
American buddy comedy films
American buddy cop films
American science fiction comedy films
American science fiction action films
American sequel films
Columbia Pictures films
Fictional-language films
Films scored by Danny Elfman
Films based on American comics
Films directed by Barry Sonnenfeld
Films set in New York City
Films about dogs
Films about altered memories
Films shot in Los Angeles
Films shot in New York City
Films with screenplays by Robert Gordon
Men in Black (franchise)
Films about extraterrestrial life
2000s buddy comedy films
2000s buddy cop films
Impact of the September 11 attacks on cinema
2002 comedy films
Films produced by Walter F. Parkes
2000s English-language films
2000s American films